The 2016–17 FIU Panthers women's basketball team represented Florida International University during the 2016–17 NCAA Division I women's basketball season. The Panthers, led by first year head coach Tiara Malcom, played their home games at FIU Arena, and were members of Conference USA. They finished the season 5–24, 3–15 in C-USA play to finish in 13th place. They failed to qualify for the Conference USA women's tournament.

Roster

Schedule

|-
!colspan=9 style="background:#002D62; color:#C5960C;"| Non-conference regular season

|-
!colspan=9 style="background:#002D62; color:#C5960C;"| Conference USA regular season

See also
2016–17 FIU Panthers men's basketball team

References

FIU Panthers women's basketball seasons
FIU
FIU Panthers women's basketball team
FIU Panthers women's basketball team